Kenan & Kel is an American buddy comedy sitcom created by Kim Bass. The show originally aired on the Nickelodeon network for four seasons, from July 15, 1996, to July 15, 2000. Set in Chicago, Illinois, the series follows mischievous Kenan Rockmore (Kenan Thompson) and his happy-go-lucky best friend Kel Kimble (Kel Mitchell), who go on a number of misadventures.

The show features Kenan's family, which consists of his father Roger (Ken Foree), mother Sheryl (Teal Marchande), and younger sister Kyra (Vanessa Baden). The show also features Kenan's boss Chris Potter (Dan Frischman). Kenan & Kel features appearances from a number of guest stars, including game show host/radio disc jockey Bob Eubanks, basketball player Ron Harper, and singer Britney Spears.

It won the "Favorite TV Show" award at the 1998 Kids' Choice Awards. After the conclusion of the series, it was followed by the television film Two Heads Are Better Than None (2000).

The first two seasons were taped at Nickelodeon Studios at Universal Studios Florida. The last two seasons were taped at the now closed theater Nickelodeon on Sunset in Los Angeles, California.

Premise
Set in Chicago, Illinois, Kenan & Kel follows Kenan Rockmore and Kel Kimble, a pair of high school students who go on various misadventures, which usually occur as a result of Kenan devising a scheme to get rich quick, or avoid trouble with his elders. These schemes are often foiled as a result of Kel's aloof nature and clumsiness.

The show employs a number of running gags. Episodes open and close with Kenan and Kel breaking the fourth wall by interacting with a studio audience, standing in front of a red curtain that is placed in front of the main set while they are still in character. Usually they do stuff that relates to the episode itself, for example, in the opening of "The Tainting of the Screw", Kel is seen wearing fishing gear, and the episode is about Kenan choking on a screw that was in his tuna sandwich. A running gag of the openings is Kel never knowing what the night's episode would be about and Kenan refusing to tell him, while the closings frequently feature Kenan coming up with a new scheme, often asking Kel to get various assorted items and meet him somewhere. Frazzled both times, Kel exclaims his catchphrase, "Aww, here it goes!" (which both opens and closes the show).

Production
Kenan & Kel was created by Kim Bass, and stars Kenan Thompson and Kel Mitchell as the title characters. The actors previously starred in the Nickelodeon series All That. Mitchell and Thompson would joke around on the set of All That, which caught the attention of producers, including Bass, who wished to package Thompson and Mitchell in a series. During a hiatus of All That, the producers kept Thompson and Mitchell so they could tape the pilot for Kenan & Kel. Mitchell later expressed fondness working with Thompson on the series. Kenan & Kel was Mitchell's second professional acting performance, having only worked on All That and in amateur theater productions in Chicago beforehand. Thompson's previous experience included a role in D2: The Mighty Ducks (1994). Kenan is the series' straight man, and Kel is his comedic foil.

The first season contains 14 episodes, taped between April and August 9, 1996. The season was taped in front of a studio audience at Universal Studios Florida. The characters of Kenan and Kel make a crossover appearance on the Nickelodeon series Cousin Skeeter.

Broadcast
Reruns of the series briefly aired on Nick GAS in 1999. After the series finished its run, reruns continued to air on Nickelodeon from January 21, 2001, to February 15, 2004.

The series reran on The N as part of the "TEENick on The N" block from October 13, 2007, to August 2, 2009. Reruns started airing on the successor channel TeenNick from July 25, 2011, to February 3, 2013, and again from March 4, 2013, to May 31, 2014, as part of its The '90s Are All That programming block (later called The Splat, NickSplat and NickRewind). The series also airs reruns frequently on Nickelodeon's Pluto TV channel. It also streams on Paramount+ and Netflix (Netflix having only the first two seasons with many episodes missing).

In the United Kingdom, the series aired on Nickelodeon from 1997 to 2012. The series now reruns on Trace Vault.

Characters

Episodes

Home media
Kenan & Kel has been released on DVD in the compilations Best of Seasons 1 & 2 and Best of Season 3 & 4. Both are DVD-R releases manufacture on demand through Amazon.com. Individual seasons are not available. The Best of Seasons 1 & 2 DVD is missing 3 episodes ("In the Line of Kenan", "Baggin' Saggin Kel", and ""Safe and Sorry"; all from season 1) to complete the set, but Season 2 is complete. The Best of Seasons 3 & 4 DVD is also missing 3 episodes ("The Chicago Witch Trials", "Freezer Burned", and "Who Love Who-ooh?"; all from Season 3), but Season 4 is complete. These DVD releases are absent of any bonus features.

On July 28, 2011, the first season of Kenan & Kel was released on the iTunes Store.
On November 29, 2011, the second season was released. On February 13, 2012, the third season was released. On August 13, 2012, the fourth season was released. Seasons 1 and 2 were released on the UK iTunes store in September 2013. As of 2021, most of the series is available to watch on Paramount+. Seasons 1 and 2 can be found on Netflix, except for "Baggin' Saggin' Kel", "Safe and Sorry", "Bye Bye, Kenan: Part 1" and "Bye Bye, Kenan: Part 2".

Legacy
In a December 3, 2022, Saturday Night Live comedy sketch, Kenan Thompson, a longtime SNL cast member, appears in a spoof of Kenan & Kel called Kenan & Kelly with guest host Keke Palmer. In the skit, Palmer explains her desire to reboot Kenan & Kel after meeting Thompson and expressing her fondness of him during his Nickelodeon years. The skit is intercut between pseudo-interviews and recreations of the Rigby's grocery store set from the original series featuring Thompson, Palmer, and Mitchell. The addition of elements such as Palmer's disapproval of the word "idiot" to describe her, her pregnancy reveal, the robbery of Rigby's, and the subsequent shooting death of Kel are played for dramatic effect, which Thompson concludes as a reason why the "reboot" failed.

References

External links

 

1996 American television series debuts
2000 American television series endings
1990s American black sitcoms
1990s American teen sitcoms
1990s American workplace comedy television series
1990s Nickelodeon original programming
2000s American black sitcoms
2000s American teen sitcoms
2000s American workplace comedy television series
2000s Nickelodeon original programming
All That
American television spin-offs
English-language television shows
Hip hop television
Television duos
Television series about families
Television series about teenagers
Television series about television
Television series by Tollin/Robbins Productions
Television shows filmed in California
Television shows filmed in Florida
Television shows set in Chicago